Tõhela is a village in Tõstamaa Parish, Pärnu County, in southwestern Estonia. It has a population of 51 (as of 1 January 2011).

Tõhela was first mentioned in 1518 as Toegel and Toigel. But the place itself has been inhabited earlier before, as prove the gravesites from the beginning of the 2nd millennium.

Lake Tõhela is located south, in the neighbouring Männikuste village.

Gallery

References

External links
Website of Tõhela region (Alu, Kiraste, Männikuste and Tõhela villages) 

Villages in Pärnu County